Joytime is the debut studio album by electronic producer and DJ Marshmello, which was self-released through his label, Joytime Collective on January 8, 2016. When it was released it landed on iTunes top electronic albums on the first day.

Singles 
The first single "Keep It Mello", featuring vocals from rapper Omar LinX, was released on October 24, 2015.

A remix by Marshmello and Slushii of "Want U 2", a song from the album, was released as a single but not in promotion of the album.

Critical reception 
Ryan James Blair of Festival Forecast gave Joytime a 7.5/10 rating, stating "Joytime starts strong with a screeching synth, mallet melodies, and a smooth bass as he [Marshmello] taunts listeners with the vocal hook (Everybody Knows Me.... Marshmello)." The rest of Joytime does not vary much from the opening track as each song sticks to the strong formula that includes a smooth bass line, sharp synths, simple risers and percussion buildups, trap hats and strong kicks. 'Summer' is perhaps the biggest change of pace with a nice downtempo beat, but at times the sub bass can almost be overwhelming for the slower tempo and context."

Track listing

Personnel 
Credits adapted from Tidal.

Performers
Marshmello – vocals, production, mixing, recording
Omar LinX – rapping

Charts

Weekly charts

Year-end charts

References 

Marshmello albums
2016 debut albums